P. indica may refer to:
 Paravalsa indica, a fungus species
 Persea indica, a plant species
 Pleodorina indica, a colonial green alga species in the genus Pleodorina
 Plumbago indica, the scarlet leadwort, a pot plant species originally from India
 Potentilla indica, the mock strawberry or Indian strawberry, a plant species
 Pseudomonas indica, a Gram-negative, butane-using bacterium species first isolated in India
 Pulvinaria indica, a scale insect species in the genus Pulvinaria
 Piriformospora indica, an endophytic root colonizing fungus, first isolated from the Thar Desert in India

Synonyms
 Periploca indica, a synonym for Hemidesmus indicus, a plant species found in South Asia

See also
 Indica (disambiguation)